1980 Empress's Cup Final was the 2nd final of the Empress's Cup competition. The final was played at Mitsubishi Yowa Sugamo Ground in Tokyo on March 22, 1981. Shimizudaihachi SC won the championship.

Overview
Shimizudaihachi SC won their 1st title, by defeating FC Jinnan 2–0.

Match details

See also
1980 Empress's Cup

References

Empress's Cup
1980 in Japanese women's football